Samantha Maloney (born December 11, 1975) is an American musician best known for playing in the bands Hole and Mötley Crüe. She has also performed live with Eagles of Death Metal and Peaches.

Early career
Maloney received her first drum-kit at the age of five. Drumming immediately became a significant part of her life. At the age of fourteen she enrolled at Fiorello H. LaGuardia High School of Music & Art and Performing Arts in New York City, and for the next three years studied percussion extensively.

Music career

Shift (1993–1998)
At the age of sixteen, she auditioned for the post-hardcore band Shift as a replacement drummer and the band gave her the position permanently.

While playing in Shift, Maloney excelled on her school's basketball team, and in 1993, had to decide whether or not to pursue a serious basketball career with college scholarship offers or to continue drumming in her band Shift. Samantha chose to stick with Shift who released two independent records on Equal Vision Records in 1994 and 1995. Two years later, Shift signed to Columbia Records and made their major-label debut album titled, Get In. Following the album's release the band toured.

Hole (1998–2000)

In 1998, Maloney was offered an audition in Los Angeles for the role of drummer in Hole, a position vacated by Patty Schemel. With her audition a success she was accepted by the band and so officially joined up with Hole, leaving Shift behind to join the band. At 22, Maloney was on the road with Hole at the height of their popularity, playing sold out arenas and touring extensively in the U.S., Australia, Japan, and the United Kingdom whilst also appearing on television and in magazines, as well as Hole's recordings and videos.

Mötley Crüe (2000)

In 2000, Hole went on hiatus and Maloney was offered the drum chair for Mötley Crüe to fill in for then-drummer Randy Castillo, who was out of action due to a duodenal ulcer. She is the drummer on the live DVD of the New Tattoo tour, Motley Crue – Lewd, Crued & Tattooed.

The Chelsea part 1 (2004)
In 2004, Maloney, alongside Melissa Auf der Maur (The Smashing Pumpkins/Hole), Paz Lenchantin (A Perfect Circle), and Radio Sloan (The Need) created a new band called The Chelsea. The all-female group only played one show before quickly going their separate ways.

The Chelsea part 2 (2004–2005)
Having worked with and for others on their music, the drummer decided to start composing her own album, and in mid-2003 she began to turn down high-profile gigs in order to start her solo project, pausing briefly on July 7, 2004, to fill in as the drummer for a band on Sympathy for the Record Industry called Scarling. in order to perform live at a group art show at the Copro/Nason Gallery (Santa Monica, California).

In 2004, just as she had completed her first batch of songs, Maloney was asked by former Hole frontwoman Courtney Love to fly to France (after drummer Patty Schemel departed for the second time) and add drums to Love's otherwise complete solo debut, America's Sweetheart.
Returning to the States, Maloney was asked to assemble a live band for Courtney Love, reconnecting with guitarist Radio Sloan, finding guitarist Lisa Leveridge and bassist Dvin to form the core of the band. After playing with the band for a few weeks Love decided to call her new band "The Chelsea" after Maloney's previous musical endeavour. Love added Violinist Emilie Autumn to the band at a later date. The band was put on hiatus after a small number of gigs, including Love's bizarre appearance on the "Late Show with David Letterman", where the singer bared her breasts, lit up a cigarette and rambled about Nicole Kidman, the Federal Communications Commission (FCC) and her legal problems and after performing at Plaid in New York where Love was arrested Thursday morning (March 18) at 2:30 am, after allegedly throwing a blunt object into the audience, hitting a 24-year-old man in the head.

Eagles of Death Metal (2005)

However, Maloney was soon approached by old friend Josh Homme to drum for his side-project Eagles of Death Metal. Maloney accepted the gig and toured with Eagles of Death Metal opening for Queens of the Stone Age all over the world.

Peaches (2006–2007)

In 2006, Samantha toured with Electroclash punk artist Peaches' live band, The Herms along with JD Samson and Radio Sloan in support of her 2006 release Impeach My Bush.

Rebirth of The Chelsea Girls (2009)
In January 2009, Samantha joined with Allison Robertson (of The Donnas), former Playboy model/Disk-Jockey and Huntress singer Jill Janus, and Corey Parks (ex. Nashville Pussy), to form the Chelsea Girls. The band is an all-girl cover band. The band's name references an Andy Warhol flick and a premise—the greatest anthems from the likes of AC/DC, Judas Priest, Blondie and even some Madonna.  In the spirit of Camp Freddy, they brought in special guests including Lemmy from Motörhead and Carmen Electra who is now the unofficial fifth member as the band's emcee.

The Ingenues
In August 2007, a new project was announced: The Ingenues. According to their MySpace page, they are “a select group of uber talented femmes who have collaborated with up and coming producer extraordinaire Samantha Maloney (Hole, Eagles of Death Metal, The Herms, Mötley Crüe, Scarling.) to make a collection of songs to bring to their masses". The project will include Jessicka (Scarling./Jack Off Jill), Radio Sloan (The Need, The Chelsea, The Herms, Le Tigre), and Lisa Leveridge. 
Maloney is working on new material along with singer Jessicka for The Ingenues. They have released one single titled "Happy For You" available on iTunes.

Brother Clyde
On June 30, 2010, Billy Ray Cyrus released on his Facebook account information about the new alternative rock group, Brother Clyde, with the old members substituted by Samantha Maloney, Jamie Miller, Dan Knight and Dave Henning. He also stated that their single, "Lately", was available on iTunes and that their debut album would be out on August 10, 2010.

Miscellaneous work
In February 2001, she contributed to music for Daryl Hannah's documentary about a stripper called Stripnotes. In May, she worked on The Desert Sessions Vol. 7 & 8 with Josh Homme (Queens of the Stone Age), Mark Lanegan (Screaming Trees), and Chris Goss (Masters of Reality).

In June 2003, she and Scott Ian from Anthrax composed music for the Mr. Show movie Run Ronnie Run as "Titanica". During this time Maloney also added live drums to the score for the film Black Hawk Down.

She once managed the Los Angeles-based all-girl teenage rock group, Cherri Bomb. She made the decision to manage the band after seeing them perform as the opening act at the first Chelsea Girls show. On October 29, 2012, Maloney resigned from her position as the band's manager.

Filmography
In 2008, Maloney guest starred as "Sam", Lew Ashby's chauffeur on three episodes of the Showtime series Californication.

She played the part of Maureen Tucker in the 2006 film Factory Girl, starring Sienna Miller as Edie Sedgwick.

Discography

With Shift
 Pathos EP (1994)
 Spacesuit (1995)
 Get In (1997)

With Mötley Crüe
New Tattoo (2000) (Bonus “Live in Salt Lake City” disc)
Lewd, Crüed & Tattooed (DVD) (2002)

With Courtney Love
America's Sweetheart (2004)

With Peaches
Impeach My Bush (2006)

References

External links
 Samantha Maloney website (archive.org, page saved 11/2013)
 
 Samantha Maloney at Modern Drummer

1975 births
Living people
American heavy metal drummers
Mötley Crüe members
Hole (band) members
Musicians from New York (state)
People from Queens, New York
Brother Clyde members
American rock drummers
American women drummers
20th-century American drummers
20th-century American women musicians
21st-century American women musicians
21st-century American drummers
Scarling. members
Eagles of Death Metal members
Feminist musicians